The National Institute of Electronics (NIE) is an autonomous research institution under administrative control of the Ministry of Science and Technology (Pakistan) of the Pakistan. Abdul Majeed Soomro is current director general of NIE.

History 
The National Institute of Electronics was established in 1979 through an ordinance proclaimed by the President of Pakistan.

Research and development labs
The institution has the following research and development departments:

 Automation & Control Engineering Group
 Center for Software Development & Training in Advance Databases
 Center for Quality Testing & Certification of Electronics Products
 Communication Engineering Group
 Integrated Circuit Design Center
 Large Scale Electronic Display Group
 PCB Design & Fabrication

Products 
NIE produce different products related to electronics field, including electronic voting machines, ECG machines, GSM based energy meters, surface mount technology production lines (SMTPL), 1KVA smooth power line conditioners and 3KVA solar based inverters.

Electronic voting machine 
In 2015, NIE produced first electronic voting machine (EMV) for Election Commission of Pakistan. In 2021, NIE started productions of upgraded version of electronic voting machine on directions of Ministry of Science and Technology (MoST). Each EMV consist of 3 units with following specifications.

ECG machine

GSM based energy meter

3KVA solar based inverter

1KVA smooth power line conditioner

LED lights 
NIE produce different types of LED lights.
 LED light (ceiling)
 LED street light
 LED tube lights

NIEECHS 
National Institute of Electronic Employees Cooperative Housing Society (NIEECHS) is a housing society for employees of NIE, with 230 Kanals land on Fateh Jang Road near Nougazi, close to sector F-16 Islamabad. It was established in 1980.

References

External links
 NIE official website 
 Ministry of Science and Technology

Pakistan federal departments and agencies
Science and technology in Pakistan
Research institutes in Pakistan
1979 establishments in Pakistan